The European Association for Astronomy Education or EAAE is a non-profit European organization for the promotion of science education  in general, and of astronomy in particular.

 
The Organization was founded on November 25, 1995, in Athens, as a result of the Declaration  of the EU/ESO workshop on Teaching of Astronomy in Europe's Secondary Schools that was held at the European Southern Observatory (ESO) Headquarters in Garching in November 1994.

Structure 
The Professional association|Association gathers the General Assembly for strategic decisions, and an Executive Council as the operational management. There are also National Representatives with a role on promoting the EAAE and its activities in their countries.

Working Groups 

International activities are promoted through the activity of three Working Groups.

 Working Group 1 "Collaborative Projects" intends to promote collaborative work between teachers and students of different countries by creating specific science project activities for schools. 
 Working Group 2 "Catch a Star" promotes school research projects about astronomical objects through a contest. The previous contests have been organized as a joint venture with the European Southern Observatory (ESO). 
 Working Group 3 "Summer Schools" promotes teacher training about Astronomy Education. It provides an opportunity for  teachers to learn about simple educational materials for their classes.

Partnerships 
The EAAE has had a long term collaboration with the European Southern Observatory (ESO) in many projects, including "Astronomy On-Line" or "Catch a Star"  and  has also collaborated with the European Space Agency (ESA) and with the European Organization for Nuclear Research (CERN) on the organization of Physics on Stage and Science on Stage. 
Like most major organizations, since 2009 the EAAE has grown in social networks and has now mirrors of the "EAAE News"  on Facebook, Twitter and Portal to the Universe.
The EAAE has also collaborations with The European Planetarium Network (EuroPlaNet) and with the Euro-Asian Association of Teachers of Astronomy (EAATA).

See also
 List of astronomical societies

References

External links 
European Association for Astronomy Education(EAAE)Webpage
EAAE News blog
The European Planetarium Network (EuroPlaNet)
Euro-Asian Association of Teachers of Astronomy (EAATA)

Astronomy in Europe
Astronomy organizations
Educational organizations based in Europe